Paulina Radziulytė-Kalvaitienė (14 February 1905 – 19 June 1986) was a Lithuanian athlete and basketball player. She was the first woman representative of Lithuania at the Olympic Games, and a silver medalist at the EuroBasket Women 1938. She was one of the most famous and accomplished sportswomen in inter-war Lithuania.

As an athlete, she competed in various events, but mostly in sprints and middle-distance running. She competed in the women's 800 metres at the 1928 Summer Olympics. She was a Lithuanian champion in athletics 27 times and achieved Lithuanian national records 26 times. Five times (in 1927, 1928, 1934, 1936, and 1937) she was Lithuanian champion in women's basketball with the LFLS team. With the LFLS team she also won gold in women's basketball at the first Lithuanian National Olympics in July 1938. A member of the Lithuanian team, she won silver at the EuroBasket Women 1938.

During World War II, she retreated to Germany and moved to Switzerland and Australia, eventually settling in Boston, Massachusetts in 1958. In 1961–1981, she worked as a teacher at a Lithuanian school and was active in scouting. She directed school's plays and published a collection of plays in 1976.

Lithuanian athletics champion
Radziulytė won gold in the following events at the Lithuanian Athletics Championships:

 60 metres: 1926, 1927
 100 metres: 1928, 1932, 1934, 1935
 200 metres: 1927–1929, 1932, 1934, 1935
 400 metres: 1923, 1924
 800 metres: 1928, 1929
 1000 metres: 1927
 4 × 100 metres relay: 1926–1928, 1935
 Long jump: 1924, 1927
 High jump: 1927
 Shot put: 1923, 1924
 Triathlon (100 metres, long jump, and shot put): 1935

National records
Radziulytė held the following national records:

 60 metres: three times, from 8.5 seconds in 1926 to 8.1 seconds in 1929
 100 metres: four times, from 14.9 seconds in 1924 to 13.3 seconds in 1935
 200 metres: four times, from 29.4 seconds in 1927 to 27.9 seconds in 1934
 400 metres: three times, from 1:13.7 in 1923 to 1:07.4 in 1932
 800 metres: twice, from 2:46.3 in 1928 to 2:45.2 in 1929
 4 × 100 metres relay: 57.2 seconds in 1927
 Long jump: 4.32 metres in 1926
 High jump: twice, 1.30 and 1.31 metres in 1927
 Shot put:  four times, from 7.60 metres in 1924 to 9.04 metres in 1931
 Javelin throw: 21.62 metres in 1924
 Triathlon (100 metres, long jump, and shot put): 939 points in 1935

References

1905 births
1986 deaths
Athletes (track and field) at the 1928 Summer Olympics
Lithuanian female middle-distance runners
Lithuanian women's basketball players
Lithuanian emigrants to the United States
Olympic athletes of Lithuania
People from Velikiye Luki